The German Journal of Industrial Relations is a peer-reviewed scientific journal publishing research in the field of industrial relations.

The journal appears quarterly.  From 1994 to 2016 it was published by Rainer Hampp Verlag in Mering, and by Verlag Barbara Budrich starting in 2017. Manuscripts can be submitted in English or German.

According to the SCImago Journal Rank, the journal had a 2015 SJR indicator of 0.211.

References

External links
Industrielle Beziehungen @ Budrich UniPress
The German Journal listed in WorldCat

Publications established in 1994
Quarterly journals